Dirty Pair may refer to:

Dirty Pair, a series of light novels written by Haruka Takachiho
Dirty Pair: Project Eden, a 1986 film based on the anime series.
Dirty Pair Flash, an OVA remake directed by Takahito Kimura
The Dirty Pair, an original English-language manga series by Adam Warren